Lazarous Kambole (born 20 January 1994) is a Zambian footballer who plays as a forward for Young Africans and the Zambia national football team.

Career

Young Africans
Following his release by Kaizer Chiefs at the end of the 2021–22 season, Kambole joined Tanzanian club Young Africans, signing a two-year deal with the club.

International career

International goals
Scores and results list Zambia's goal tally first.

References

External links

1994 births
Living people
Zambian footballers
Zambia international footballers
Konkola Mine Police F.C. players
Konkola Blades F.C. players
ZESCO United F.C. players
Kaizer Chiefs F.C. players
Association football forwards
Sportspeople from Lusaka
Zambian expatriate footballers
Zambian expatriate sportspeople in South Africa
Expatriate soccer players in South Africa
Zambia A' international footballers
2018 African Nations Championship players
Zambian expatriate sportspeople in Tanzania
Expatriate footballers in Tanzania
Young Africans S.C. players